Speech enhancement aims to improve speech quality by using various algorithms. The objective of enhancement is improvement in intelligibility and/or overall perceptual quality of degraded speech signal using audio signal processing techniques.

Enhancing of speech degraded by noise, or noise reduction, is the most important field of speech enhancement, and used for many applications such as mobile phones, VoIP, teleconferencing systems, speech recognition, speaker diarization, and hearing aids.

Algorithms 
The algorithms of speech enhancement for noise reduction can be categorized into three fundamental classes: filtering techniques, spectral restoration, and model-based methods.
 Filtering Techniques
 Spectral Subtraction Method
 Wiener Filtering
 Signal subspace approach (SSA)
 Spectral Restoration
 Minimum Mean-Square-Error Short-Time Spectral Amplitude Estimator (MMSE-STSA)
 Speech-Model-Based

See also 
 Audio noise reduction
 Speech coding
 Speech interface guideline
 Speech processing
 Speech recognition
 Voice analysis

References 

 J. Benesty, M. M. Sondhi, Y. Huang (ed). Springer Handbook of Speech Processing. Springer, 2007. .
 J. Benesty, S. Makino, J. Chen (ed). Speech Enhancement. Springer, 2005. .
 P. C. Loizou. Speech Enhancement: Theory and Practice.  CRC Press, 2013. .

Speech processing